Tom McNamara (May 7, 1886 – May 19, 1964) was an American film director, screenwriter and cartoonist from the 1910s to the 1940s. He is perhaps best known for his involvement as a director of several Our Gang shorts for the Hal Roach studio, and as the creator of the comic strip Us Boys in William Randolph Hearst's New York Journal.

Partial filmography
The Gilded Lily (1921) (titles)
The Idol of the North (1921) (titles)
One Terrible Day (1922)
Fire Fighters (1922)
Young Sherlocks (1922)
Saturday Morning (1922)
A Quiet Street (1922)
The Cobbler (1923)
A Pleasant Journey (1923) (titles)
Boys to Board (1923) (story, titles)
Sparrows (1926) (uncredited)
Little Orphan Annie (1932) (writer)

External links

Filmography and listing of McNamara's comics works

The chapter on comics from Gilbert Seldes's "Seven Liveley Arts" which makes mention of McNamara's "Us Boys"

1886 births
1964 deaths
American film directors
Hal Roach Studios filmmakers
American cartoonists